Gandhisagar Dam is situated at a distance of 168 km from the District headquarter. The Dam is constructed on the Chambal River.

The Gandhi Sagar Dam is one of the four major dams built on India's Chambal River. The dam is located in the Mandsaur, districts of the state of Madhya Pradesh. The dam's foundation stone was laid by Prime Minister of India Pandit Jawaharlal Nehru on 7 March 1954, and construction of the main dam was done by leading contractor Dwarka Das Agrawal & Associates and was completed in 1960. Additional dam structures were completed downstream in the 1970s.

The dam sports a 115-MW hydroelectric power station at its toe, with five 23-MW generating units each providing a total energy generation of about 564 GWh.

It attracts many migratory and non-migratory birds throughout the year. The International Bird Life Agency (IBA) has qualified the reservoir under "A4iii" criteria, as the congregation of waterbirds is reported to exceed 20,000 at some points.

Geography

It flows north-northeast through Madhya Pradesh, runs for a time through Rajasthan, then forms the boundary between Rajasthan and Madhya Pradesh before turning southeast to join the Yamuna River in the state of Uttar Pradesh.

The Chambal and its tributaries drain the Malwa region of northwestern Madhya Pradesh, while its tributary, the Banas, which rises in the Aravalli Range, drains southeastern Rajasthan. At its confluence with the Yamuna, the Chambal joins four other rivers – the Yamuna, Kwari, Sind, and Pahuj – at Pachnada near Bhareh in Uttar Pradesh, at the border of the Bhind and Etawah districts.

Construction history

The Chambal River Valley Development marked one of the landmark actions of the First Five-Year Plan launched by the Government of India in 1951, after India attained independence in August 1947. The Chambal River had not until then been used for any major developmental works, and was proposed to be developed under a joint initiative of the state governments of Madhya Pradesh and Rajasthan. The three-stage proposal, drawn up in 1953, called for three dams to provide hydroelectric power generation, and a downstream barrage to use stored waters released from the upstream dams for irrigation.

Stage I
Power generation at Gandhi Sagar Dam was through a powerhouse at the toe of the dam, with a total installed capacity of 115 MW (divided into five units of 23 MW). The Kota Barrage, an earth and masonry structure  in height, was built to provide irrigation through a canal system, with two main canals on the right and left banks. Construction of both projects began in 1953–54; both began functioning in 1960. The water received at the Kota Barrage is shared equally between Madhya Pradesh and Rajasthan for irrigation.

Stage II
In addition, a powerhouse at the toe of the dam provides an additional hydroelectric power generation capacity of 172 MW from four turbo generators, of 43 MW capacity each. The second stage was completed in 1970. The power generated at the Rana Pratap Sagar Dam is shared equally with Madhya Pradesh, as the Gandhi Sagar Dam provides the stored waters for use at this dam.

Stage III
The third and final stage of development envisaged an intermediate dam between the Rana Pratap Sagar Dam and the Kota Barrage, called the Jawahar Sagar Dam. This project was commissioned in 1972.

Features

The spillway of the dam is designed for a discharge of 21,238 cubic metres per second. There are 10 gated spillway spans to pass the designed flood discharge. In addition, 9 river sluices have also been provided, but these have not been functional.

The hydroelectric power station is located at the toe of the dam on the right bank. The total flow through the five turbines is 311.15 m3/s. The power station has an installation of 142 MW with five turbines of 23 MW and one unit of 27 MW capacity. Power is supplied first to the local district and then to other regions of Madhya Pradesh and Rajasthan. The Gandhi Sagar Dam and Power Station were built at a total cost of about Rs. 2.3 billion.

Reservoir
The sanctuary's forested area was once a hunting area of the Holkar royal family of Indore. The reservoir is under the control of the irrigation and fisheries departments of the Government of Madhya Pradesh, and is mostly used for fisheries development also.

Scientific studies indicate that the reservoir is productive as regards fisheries, with the reservoir water indicating a moderate-to-high rate of primary productivity. Commercial Fisheries was initiated in 1959–60 in Gandhi Sagar, and has been credited as the best-managed reservoir in the state. Fish capture in the reservoir is prohibited between 16 June and 15 August. The reservoir attracts many migratory and non-migratory birds throughout the year, has been qualified under "A4iii criteria" by the IBA, as the bird congregation is of more than 20,000 waterbirds.

Suggested reservoir amendment
Analysis of hydroelectric power generation performed by the three power plants in the Chambal valley has been carried out by a non-governmental agency, based on statistics provided by the Central Electricity Authority under the RTI Act. The results indicate that the Gandhi Sagar reservoir attained its full storage condition only during five years of its first five decades of operation. The energy generation of all the three power plants declined by 25% in the same period of 50 years, relative to the projected 50-year figures. Keeping these aspects in view, in 2011 it was suggested that the full reservoir level in the Gandhi Sagar Dam be reduced by suitable operational guidelines, which would enable the release of substantial submergence area for cultivation by the farmers who originally owned these lands.

In 2022, a 1,440MW pumped-storage hydroelectricity project was underway, using the Gandhi Sagar reservoir as the lower reservoir.

References

Dams in Madhya Pradesh
Chambal River
Hydroelectric power stations in Madhya Pradesh
Geography of Malwa
Neemuch
Gravity dams
Dams on the Yamuna River
Dams completed in 1960
1960 establishments in Madhya Pradesh
20th-century architecture in India